The Female of the Species was the fifth Bulldog Drummond novel. It was published in 1928 and written by H. C. McNeile under the pen name Sapper.
 

It was adapted into the 1937 American film Bulldog Drummond Comes Back directed by Louis King and starring John Barrymore and John Howard.

References

Bibliography

 

1928 British novels
British crime novels
English novels
Hodder & Stoughton books
British novels adapted into films